Pachamama is a goddess revered by the indigenous people of the Andes.

Pachamama or Pacha Mama may also refer to:

 "Pacha Mama" (song), the second movement of Mike Oldfield's 1999 album The Millennium Bell
 Pachamama (1944 film), Argentine film that won two honors at the 1945 Argentine Film Critics Association Awards
 Pacha Mama (peak), highest point on Peru’s island Amantaní in Lake Titicaca
 Pachamama (song), single by the Peruvian band Uchpa
 Pachamama (film), Netflix Original film.
 Pachamama (wasp), a wasp genus in the family Trichogrammatidae
 Pachamama Cine, Argentine film distributor for the 2007 film La Antena
 Pachamama, 2008 Brazilian documentary directed by Eryk Rocha
 Pachamama, French and Argentine 2018 animated film directed by Juan Antin
 Pachamama, 1986 album by Bolivian quintet Rumillajta
 Pacha Mama, 1991 album by Chaski
 Pachamama, two-part EP released in 2012 by Raine Maida
 Pachamama, a Serbian Latin American music band recorded on the 1996 album Muzičke paralele
 "Pachamama (la terre mere)", 2013 single by French–Armenian singer Patrick Fiori

See also
 Pachamama Raymi, a ceremony held annually in Ecuador and Peru